The 2007 Oceania Handball Champions Cup was held in Tahiti from the 22 October to 2 November 2007. With 6 teams from 4 countries competing in Tahiti for the second edition of the Men Oceania Champions Cup, the level of play was much higher than during the first edition.

The final saw defending champions JS Mont Dore from New Caledonia taking another Oceania Champions Cup over hosts AS Dragon. The third place play off saw AS Dumbea of New Caledonia beat Australian side Canberra. Auckland were fifth and Tahitian side AS Faa'a were sixth.

Final standings

References

 Report on Auckland webpage 
 Photos of tournament

Oceania Handball Champions Cup
2007 in handball